The Buni Zom group is a prominent mountain area of Chitral, in the Hindu Raj range of Pakistan. It is located about 50 km (30 mi) northeast of the town of Chitral, and about 50 km (30 mi) east of Tirich Mir (7,708 m), the highest peak in the Hindu Kush.

In 1957, the New Zealanders W.K.A. Berry and C.H. Tyndale-Biscoe accomplished the first ascent of the Main Peak of Buni Zom from the steep razorlike north ridge The second ascent was in 1975 by Japanese Masao Okabe, Hideo Sato and Shigeru Tabe and third ascent was in 1979 by Americans Joe Reinhard and Richard J. Isherwood both from south face.

The Buni Zom group has many other peaks, some of which have been climbed.

Peaks of the Buni Zom Group
Following is a list of the peaks over 6,000 meters in the Buni Zom group, from the Himalayan Index. The first ascent of the peak named Buni Zom SS or 6MT or P6110 was by Nikolas Kroupis and George Voutiropoulos on 31 July 2007  this climb is not yet recorded in the Himalayan Index, but the article is published in American Alpine Journal

See also
 Buni 
 Hindu Raj
 List of mountains in Pakistan
 List of Ultras of the Karakoram and Hindu Kush

Notes and references

External links
 SummitPost Buni Zom Page
 2002 Expedition Report
 2004 Expedition Report
 2007 Expedition Report, First Ascent of peak 6MT
 Northern Pakistan detailed placemarks in Google Earth

Mountains of Khyber Pakhtunkhwa
Six-thousanders of the Hindu Raj